Bloody Fight in Iron-Rock Valley is a 2011 South Korean film directed by Ji Ha Jean.

Cast
 Lee Moo-saeng as Chul‑ki
 Ji Dae-han as Pan-ho
 Yeong-jin Jo
 Sang-hwa Yoon as Kwi-myeon
 Choi Ji-eun as Tae-yeon
 Yong Jik-lee as Kak-doo
 Oh Yong as Hak Bong
 Shim Wan-joon as Policeman

Reception
The film won the award for Best Korean Independent Film at the 2011 Puchon International Fantastic Film Festival.

References

2011 directorial debut films
2011 films
South Korean action films
2010s South Korean films